Byhalia United Methodist Church is a historic Methodist church building on College Avenue in Byhalia, Mississippi.

The Late Gothic Revival style building was constructed in 1906. It was added to the National Register in 1984.

References

Methodist churches in Mississippi
Churches on the National Register of Historic Places in Mississippi
Gothic Revival church buildings in Mississippi
Churches completed in 1906
1906 establishments in Mississippi
National Register of Historic Places in Marshall County, Mississippi